Mangahanea Marae is a marae (traditional Māori meeting house) located in the East Coast township of Ruatoria in New Zealand. The marae is the within the land catchment of the descendants of Māori tribes Ngāti Porou and Ngāti Uepohatu, through the marriage of Hinetapora and Te Rangikaputua. Their descendants are connected to a number of subtribes (hapū): Uepohatu, Te Aitangā o Materoa, Hauiti, Ruataupare and Te Whānau o Umuariki.

Work commenced on the ancestral house (Whare Tipuna, the main meeting house of the marae) carvings and interior panels during the 1880s and the house was formally opened in 1896.  The unique carving and tukutuku adorned dining hall (wharekai) named Rutu Tawhiorangi, was built and opened in the late 1930s. The land under the marae was made a Māori Reserve under the Native Purposes Act 1937 (later renamed the Maori Purposes Act 1937) on 29 October 1947.

The marae was the site of an iconic Herbs album launch party in 1987.

In October 2020, the Government committed $5,756,639 from the Provincial Growth Fund to upgrade the marae and 28 other Ngāti Porou marae. The funding was expected to create 205 jobs.

References

External links 
 Managahanea Marae (official website)

Marae in New Zealand
Gisborne District
1896 establishments in New Zealand